"Sting" is a 2015 song by Swedish singer Eric Saade. He was participating with the song in Melodifestivalen 2015 in a bid to represent Sweden in the Eurovision Song Contest 2015 in Vienna, Austria. The song is co-written by Sam Arash Fahmi, Fredrik Kempe, Hamed "K-one" Pirouzpanah and David Kreuger. Saade performed the song live during the first semi-final round of Melodifestivalen on 7 February 2015 in Gothenburg's Scandinavium. Coming first/second that day, he qualified to the Finals held on 14 March 2015 in Stockholm where he came fifth overall after the televoting and jury results was revealed.

In 2017, Uno Svenningsson released a Swedish-language version of the song titled "Slå" as a part of the eighth season of Så mycket bättre.

Track listing

Chart performance

Weekly charts

Year-end charts

Certifications

Release history

References

2014 songs
2015 singles
Melodifestivalen songs of 2015
Swedish pop songs
Songs written by Fredrik Kempe
Songs written by David Kreuger
Eric Saade songs